The Actors Guild of Nigeria (AGN) is an umbrella union that regulates and represents the affairs of film actors in Nigeria and abroad. The corporate headquarter is located at Suite 29, Block 2, N.C.A.C, Artiste Village, National Theatre, Iganmu - Lagos. The body got it's member from Nollywood and it is currently headed by Emeka Rollas who serves as president since August 22, 2017. Since its founding, the Actors Guild of Nigeria (AGN) has grown to roughly (250,000) two hundred and fifty thousand registered members. In Nigeria, there are 32 states with registered members.

The State Executive is responsible for the affairs of the Chapters and is headed by the chairman. While six zones under the chapter are headed by the vice presidents of the National Executive Council.

Past presidents

Zack Orji
Ejike Asiegbu
Kanayo O. Kanayo (MFR)
Segun Arinze
Ibinabo Fiberesima
Emeka Rollas

References

Actors' trade unions
Trade unions in Nigeria
Guilds in Nigeria